Thelma Records was a record label in Detroit, Michigan from 1962 until 1966. Recordings included Emanuel Laskey, Eddie Hill, Rose Batiste, Richard Street & the Distants, Alberta Adams, The Fabulous Peps and Martha Star. The label was formed by Hazel Coleman, mother of Berry Gordy's first wife Thelma Coleman.

References

Defunct record labels of the United States
Record labels established in 1962
Defunct companies based in Michigan